The 1897 All-Ireland Senior Hurling Championship Final was the 10th All-Ireland Final and the culmination of the 1897 All-Ireland Senior Hurling Championship, an inter-county hurling tournament for the top teams in Ireland. The match was held at the Tipperary GAA Field, on 20 November 1898 between Kilkenny, represented by club side Tullaroan, and Limerick, represented by club side Kilfinane. The Leinster champions lost to their Munster opponents on a score line of 3–4 to 2–4.

Match details

1
All-Ireland Senior Hurling Championship Finals
Kilkenny county hurling team matches
Limerick county hurling team matches
November 1898 sports events